Zapalasaurus is a genus of sauropod dinosaur described by Leonardo Salgado, Ismar de Souza Carvalho and Alberto Garrido in 2006. The type species, Zapalasaurus bonapartei, was found in the La Amarga Formation of the Neuquén Basin, Neuquén Province, Argentina. It was a diplodocoid, a long-necked herbivore, and it lived during the Early Cretaceous. The authors conclude from examining the skeleton that "The record of Zapalasaurus bonapartei shows that, at least in the Neuquén Basin, basal diplodocoids were more diverse than previously thought." Zapalasaurus is assumed to have a long neck which would have been developed for feeding adaption, allowing its neck to swing in an arc like shape. This would allow Zapalasaurus to browse a wide variety of plants and greens without having to walk very far.

References

External links 
 Dinosaur Mailing List

Rebbachisaurids
Aptian life
Barremian life
Early Cretaceous dinosaurs of South America
Cretaceous Argentina
Fossils of Argentina
La Amarga Formation
Fossil taxa described in 2006